Artemisia scoparia is a Eurasian species in the genus Artemisia, in the sunflower family. It is widespread across much of Eurasia from France to Japan, including China, India, Russia, Germany, Poland, central + southwest Asia, etc.

The English common name of Artemisia scoparia is virgate wormwood, capillary wormwood, or redstem wormwood. In Mandarin Chinese it is known as yīn chén (Traditional: 茵陳) and it is an important traditional Chinese medicine, and is considered interchangeable with Artemisia capillaris for that purpose. Its pollen can be allergenic.

Chemical constituents 
 Capillarisin
Chlorogenic acid butyl ester
6,7-Dimethylesculetin
Isosabandin
Magnolioside (isoscopoletin-β-D-glucopyranoside)
7-Methoxycoumarin
7-Methylesculetin
Sabandin A
 Sabandin B
 Scoparone (6,7-dimethoxycoumarin) 
Scopoletin
β-Sitosterol
Capillin

References 

scoparia
Plants used in traditional Chinese medicine
Plants described in 1801
Flora of Asia
Flora of Europe
Flora of Lebanon and Syria